Kiedosy  is a village in the administrative district of Gmina Działoszyn, within Pajęczno County, Łódź Voivodeship, in central Poland.

References

Kiedosy